The Temple of Osiris may refer to:
Great Osiris Temple, a temple in Egypt
Lara Croft and the Temple of Osiris, a video game